The Herman T. Schneebeli Federal Building and United States Courthouse is a federal building and courthouse in Williamsport, Pennsylvania. It is one of six locations that are part of the United States District Court for the Middle District of Pennsylvania. The Herman T. Schneebeli Federal Building and Courthouse was opened in 1977 and was named after United States Representative Herman T. Schneebeli.

In 2019 the courthouse was home to the Bill Courtright bribery, extortion and criminal conspiracy case.

See also 
 List of United States federal courthouses
 Lycoming County, Pennsylvania

References 

Courthouses in Pennsylvania
Federal buildings
Williamsport, Pennsylvania